Angels Fall First is the debut studio album by Finnish symphonic metal band Nightwish, originally released by Spinefarm Records on 1 November 1997. The original 500-copy limited edition features seven tracks, two of which are not on the regular edition. This edition is highly sought after by collectors and in 2012 a copy was sold for $1137.23 on eBay. The album was released in the US by Century Media in March 2001.

Angels Fall First is a power metal album with gothic, folk and classical elements.

Background
Tuomas Holopainen wrote the music for the album during his time in the Finnish Army. In a 2008 interview with the British magazine Kerrang!, Tuomas Holopainen remembered: 
The original pressing featured Holopainen's home contact address, an accident from reprinting the demo sleeve for the album.

As of December 2009, Angels Fall First has sold more than 36,000 copies in Finland alone.

The songs of the album were played more and more seldom live leading up the departure of vocalist Tarja Turunen in October 2005, and no songs from the album were performed with vocalists Anette Olzon or Floor Jansen until the Decades: World Tour in 2018.

The band, and especially band leader and keyboardist Tuomas Holopainen has since frowned upon the album, considering it essentially an extended demo. In a 2011 interview, when asked what album other than Imaginaerum Holopainen wanted to make into a movie, he replied that it would be Angels Fall First, and that it would be "a black-and-white comedy".

The male vocals heard on "Beauty and the Beast", "The Carpenter", "Astral Romance" and "Once Upon a Troubadour" are sung by keyboardist–band leader Tuomas Holopainen, as well as the whispers in the beginning of the demo version of "Etiäinen". Following this release, Holopainen never sang credited on an album again, because he thought that he was not good enough.

Track listing

Personnel
All information from the album booklet.

Nightwish
Tarja Turunen – vocals
Tuomas Holopainen – keyboards, piano, male vocals (on track 2, 3, 4 & "Once Upon a Troubadour"), arrangements
Emppu Vuorinen – guitars, bass
Jukka Nevalainen – drums, percussion

Additional musician
Esa Lehtinen – flute

Production
Tero Kinnunen – engineering, mixing, recording
Mika Jussila – mastering
Garry Black – cover photo
Toni Härkönen – photography

Charts

Album

Singles

Certifications

References

Bibliography

External links
 Nightwish's Official Website

Nightwish albums
1997 debut albums
Spinefarm Records albums
Finnish-language albums